Benthenchelys indicus is an eel in the family Ophichthidae, described by Peter Henry John Castle in 1972, originally as a subspecies of Benthenchelys cartieri. It is a marine, deep-water-dwelling eel known only from its type locality in the eastern Indian Ocean. It inhabits the pelagic zone.

References

Ophichthidae
Fish described in 1972